In My Arms can refer to:

Songs
 "In My Arms" (Dick Haymes song)
 "In My Arms" (Erasure song)
 "In My Arms" (Mylo song)
 "In My Arms" (Plumb song)
 "In My Arms" (Kylie Minogue song)
 In My Arms, a song by Teddy Thompson from A Piece of What You Need, also performed by Glen Campbell
 "In My Arms", a song by Snow Patrol from their 2006 album Eyes Open

Albums
 In My Arms (album), a 2000 album by Crystal Gayle